Héctor Pellegrini (6 August 1931 – 1 November 1999) was an Argentine film actor.

Pellegrini came to fame in the 1961 acclaimed film Alias Gardelito and made over 50 appearances mostly in film between 1961 and 1988.

Partial filmography
 Alias Gardelito (1961)
 La Flor de Irupé (1962)
 The Terrace (1963)
 Aconcagua (1964)
 Pajarito Gómez (1965)
 Un Lugar al sol (1965)
 The ABC of Love (1967)
 Humo de Marihuana (1968)
 Ufa con el sexo (1968)
 El Santo de la Espada (1970)
 Los Neuróticos (1971)
 Bajo el signo de la patria (1971)
 Rebellion in Patagonia (1974)
 La Película (1975)
 El Fausto criollo (1979)
 Queridas amigas (1980)
 Camila (1984)
 Adiós, Roberto (1985)
 The Loves of Kafka (1988)

External links
 

1931 births
1999 deaths
Argentine male film actors
20th-century Argentine male actors